Jan-Evert Rådhström (born 1960) is a Swedish politician of the Moderate Party, member of the Riksdag since 1998.

References

Members of the Riksdag from the Moderate Party
Living people
1960 births
Members of the Riksdag 2002–2006